D.C. United is an American professional soccer club based in Washington, D.C.. The club was founded in 1995 as an inaugural Major League Soccer franchise, and began play in 1996. The club currently plays in MLS.

This list encompasses the major honors won by D.C. United, records set by the franchise, their head coaches and their players, and details the club's North American performances. The player records section includes details of the club's leading goalscorers and those who have made most appearances in first-team competitions. It also records notable achievements by United players on the international stage. Attendance records at Robert F. Kennedy Memorial Stadium, the club's home stadium since 1995, are also included in the list.

Honors 
D.C. United has won honors both domestically and in CONCACAF competitions. The team has won the MLS Cup and the MLS Supporters' Shield four times, the most championships and premierships, respectively, of any Major League Soccer franchise. Additionally, in domestic play, United has won two U.S. Open Cup titles. United is one of only two MLS sides to win a CONCACAF competition, winning the CONCACAF Champions' Cup in 1998. The last major title the club won was the Open Cup in 2013. In terms of league play, their last league premiership was in 2007, and their last league championship was in 2004.

Continental 
 CONCACAF Champions' Cup
 Winners (1): 1998
 CONCACAF Giants Cup
 Runners-up (1): 2001

Domestic 

 MLS Cup
 Winners (4): 1996, 1997, 1999, 2004
 Runners-up (1): 1998
 MLS Supporters' Shield
 Winners (4): 1997, 1999, 2006, 2007
 Runners-up (1): 1998

Cups 
 U.S. Open Cup
 Winners (3): 1996, 2008, 2013
 Runners-up (2): 1997, 2009

Player records

Appearances 

Competitive, professional matches only, appearances as substitutes in brackets.

Goalscorers 

MLS Cup Playoffs

Jaime Moreno (12)
Raúl Díaz Arce (8)
Roy Lassiter (7)
Tony Sanneh (6)
Alecko Eskandarian (4)
Marco Etcheverry (3)
Christian Gomez (3)
Ben Olsen (2)
Roy Wegerle (2)
Richie Williams (2)
Steve Rammel (2)

US Open Cup

Jaime Moreno (13)
Abdul Thompson Conten (5)
Raúl Díaz Arce (5)
Christian Gomez (4)
Eddie Pope (4)
Chris Albright (4)
Thabiso Khumalo (4)
Jamil Walker (3)
Branko Boskovic (3)
Luciano Emilio (3)
Fred (3)
Santino Quaranta (3)

CONCACAF Champions League  & Continental competitions

Luciano Emilio (9)
Christian Gomez (8)
Roy Lassiter (7)
Jaime Moreno (6)
AJ Wood (3)
Eddie Pope (2)
Fred (2)
Rod Dyachenko (2)
Francis Doe (2)
Marco Etcheverry (2)
Chris Pontius (2)

Player award winners

MLS MVP
Most Valuable Player: 
  Marco Etcheverry (1998), 
  Christian Gomez (2006), 
  Luciano Emilio (2007), 
  Dwayne De Rosario (2011)

MLS Golden Boot
Golden Boot: 
  Jaime Moreno (1997), 
  Luciano Emilio (2007), 
  Dwayne De Rosario (2011)

MLS Best XI
The MLS Best XI is an acknowledgment of the best eleven players in the league in a given season for Major League Soccer.

5 times: 
 Jaime Moreno: (1997), (1999), (2004), (2005), (2006)

4 times: 
 Marco Etcheverry: (1996), (1997), (1998), (1999)

3 times: 
 Christian Gómez: (2005), (2006), (2007)

2 times: 
 Jeff Agoos: (1997), (1999)
 Eddie Pope: (1997), (1998)
 Ryan Nelsen: (2003), (2004)
 Bobby Boswell: (2006), (2014)

1 time: 
 Troy Perkins: (2006)
 Ben Olsen: (2007)
 Luciano Emilio: (2007)
 Dwayne De Rosario: (2011)
 Chris Pontius: (2012)
 Bill Hamid: (2014)
 Luciano Acosta: (2018)
 Wayne Rooney: (2018)

Other awards

Defender of the Year: 
  Eddie Pope (1997), 
  Bobby Boswell (2006)

Coach of the Year: 
  Bruce Arena (1997), 
  Ben Olsen (2014)

Goalkeeper of the Year: 
  Troy Perkins (2006), 
  Bill Hamid (2014)

Newcomer of the Year: 
  Luciano Emilio (2007)

Rookie of the Year: 
  Ben Olsen (1998), 
  Andy Najar (2010)

Head coaching records 

 First head coach and longest serving head coach: Bruce Arena (coached the team for 131 games, from January 1996 to October 1998)

Club match records

Firsts 
First match and first league match: San Jose Clash 1–0 D.C. United, the opening match of the 1996 Major League Soccer season, April 6, 1996.
First U.S. Open Cup match: D.C. United 2–0 Carolina Dynamo, quarterfinals, September 4, 1996.
First North American match: D.C. United 1–0 United Petrotrin, CONCACAF Champions' Cup, quarterfinals, August 12, 1997.
First MLS Cup match: MetroStars 3–2 D.C. United, conference semifinals, September 24, 1996.

Record wins 
Record U.S. Open Cup win: 8–0 against New Jersey Stallions, Second round, June 27, 2001

Record defeats 
Record MLS regular season defeat:
0-7 against Philadelphia Union, July 8, 2022 
 Record MLS Cup defeat:
0–4 against Chicago Fire, October 30, 2005
 Record U.S. Open Cup defeat:
0–3 against Chicago Fire, September 3, 2006

U.S. Open Cup 

Below is D.C. United's record in U.S. Open Cup competitions. United has won three open cup titles (1996, 2008, and 2013), and has reached the final on five occasions. United's score is listed first.

Continental statistics

Record by season 

Below is D.C. United's record in North American and South American competitions. United is one of three U.S.-based clubs to compete in a South American competition.

Key

PR = Preliminary Round
GS = Group Stage
R16 = Round of 16
QF = Quarterfinals
SF = Semifinals
CM = Consolation Match
F = Final

Notes

A : Played in a one-leg series

Record by competition 

Matches that went into a penalty kick shootout are counted as draws in this table.

Record by club

International Friendlies

Drafts

The following table shows D.C. United's first-round picks in the MLS SuperDraft:

References 
General
CONCACAF Champions League and Champions Cup results sourced to: 
CONCACAF Champions League player statistics sourced to:
 
 
D.C. United player statistics prior to 2009 sourced to:
 
Major League Soccer statistics sourced to:  
North American SuperLiga statistics sourced to: 

Notes

D.C. United
DC United
DC United
D.C. United records and statistics

es:Anexo:Estadísticas del D.C. United